General Sverre Diesen (born 18 November 1949 in Oslo) is a Norwegian military officer and former Chief of Defence of Norway. Diesen was succeeded as Chief of Defence by Lieutenant General Harald Sunde on 1 October 2009.

References

Sverre Diesen at Forsvarsnett 

1949 births
Living people
Norwegian Army generals
Norwegian Institute of Technology alumni
Chiefs of Defence (Norway)